Visa requirements for citizens of North Macedonia are administrative entry restrictions by the authorities of other states placed on citizens of North Macedonia. As of January 2022, citizens of North Macedonia had visa-free or visa on arrival access to 125 countries and territories, ranking the North Macedonian passport 42nd in terms of travel freedom according to the Henley Passport Index.

Visa requirements map

Visa requirements

Unrecognized or partially recognized countries

Dependent and autonomous territories

See also

 Visa policy of North Macedonia
 North Macedonian passport

References and Notes
References

Notes

External links
 Визен режим на Република Македонија , Visa regime of North Macedonia (English) - a document compiled by the Ministry of Foreign affairs of North Macedonia, with a table listing entry requirements to North Macedonia for foreign citizens and entry requirements to foreign countries for citizens of North Macedonia

North Macedonia
Foreign relations of North Macedonia